Paramecus is a genus of beetles in the family Carabidae, containing the following species:

 Paramecus breviusculus Fairmaire, 1884
 Paramecus cylindricus Dejean, 1829
 Paramecus ellipticus (Cutris, 1839)
 Paramecus laevigatus Dejean, 1829

References

Harpalinae